Cornelius Doherty (8 November 1884 – 28 June 1967) was an Australian rules footballer who played with Melbourne in the Victorian Football League (VFL). He was named in the best players in his single game for the club.

Family
The son of Cornelius Doherty (-1905), and Hanora Doherty (c.1845-1932), née Hurley, Cornelius Doherty was born at Creswick, Victoria on 8 November 1884.

He married Elizabeth Lee in 1913.

Death
He died at his home, in South Melbourne, on 28 June 1967.

Notes

External links 

Demonwiki profile

1884 births
1967 deaths
Australian rules footballers from Victoria (Australia)
Melbourne Football Club players
South Ballarat Football Club players